Manwan is a town of Shangla District in the Khyber Pakhtunkhwa province of Pakistan.

References

Cities and towns in Shangla District